The Bahawalpur Museum, established in 1976, is a museum of archaeology, art, heritage, modern history and religion located in Bahawalpur, Punjab, Pakistan. It comes under the control of Bahawalpur district government.

As of July 2022, the director of the museum is Muhammad Zubair Rabbani.

Galleries 
The museum as eight galleries, which include:
 Pakistan Movement gallery, consisting of a collection of photographs related to the Movement, including those of its leaders.
 Archaeological gallery, which represents the archaeological history of the region.
 Islamic gallery, which exhibits arms, paintings, textile specimen, and metal work related to the history of Islam.
 Regional cultural gallery, containing specimens of everyday objects used by people in the Cholistan Desert and the  Bahawalnagar, Bahawalpur, and Rahim Yar Khan districts.
 Coin gallery, consisting of more than 300 coins
 Quran gallery, containing manuscripts, inscriptions and Quranic documents.
 Bahawalpur gallery, showing photographs and articles related to the princely state of Bahawalpur, which was the second-largest state in the British Raj.
 Cholistan gallery, displaying art and heritage of the Cholistan region.
 Sadiq Khan Gallery

See also
List of museums in Pakistan
Bahawalpur Airport
Bahawalpur Zoo
Derawar Fort
Noor Mahal

References

External links
Facebook page

Museums established in 1976
Museums in Punjab, Pakistan
Buildings and structures in Bahawalpur
1976 establishments in Pakistan
Tourist attractions in Bahawalpur